General Zhevakhov may refer to:

Filipp Zhevakhov (1752–c. 1817), Imperial Russian Army general
Ivan Zhevakhov (1762–1837), Imperial Russian Army general
Spiridon Zhevakhov (1768–1815), Imperial Russian Army general